Chen Yupeng (born January 15, 1984), also known by his stage name Chen Zhiyi, is a Chinese composer and music producer best known for writing the soundtrack of Genshin Impact, an open-world action role-playing video game by miHoYo that is one of the highest-selling mobile games in history. His work is known for its versatile style of integrating traditional Chinese musical instruments with Western orchestral arrangements. As of 2021, he is a full-time music producer at HOYO-MiX, the in-house music studio of miHoYo, and leads the music production of the game.

Chen was educated at Shenzhen Arts School and the Shanghai Conservatory of Music, and studied under the tutelage of experienced musicians who influenced his work later in his career. While he studied in college, he was already involved in composing and producing film and television music. Even before his career, his musical works won awards at various events. Chen established the Yupeng Music Studio in 2014, which had cooperative relations with many recording studios and music groups in Beijing and Shanghai, and produced works for companies including Click Music Ltd., Tencent, and NetEase.

In the early 2010s, Chen collaborated with the accoladed composer Chan Kwong-wing to produce scores for veteran film directors. Their score for Wong Jing's The Last Tycoon (2012) earned them a nomination for the "Best Original Film Score" at the 32nd Hong Kong Film Awards. The duo would not win an award until their work for The Founding of an Army (2017) earned the Golden Deer Award for the "Best Original Music Score" at the 14th Changchun Film Festival. They also produced the score for Andrew Lau's The Captain (2019), one of the all-time highest-grossing films in China. Chen had scored several films by Raymond Yip, most being horror or thrillers.

Early life and education

Chen was born on January 15, 1984, in Changsha, Hunan Province. His mother was a vocalist; to raise Chen, she stopped her career. His father majored in mathematics. The first musical inspiration came to Chen at age six, when he watched the Japanese animated film Nausicaä of the Valley of the Wind (1984) by Hayao Miyazaki. Though he did not understand the story, he was deeply moved by the soundtrack and "felt the power of music" for the first time. During his childhood, he also discovered his musical talent as he was sensitive to pitch.

In 1996, at the age of twelve, Chen enrolled at Shenzhen Arts School and studied under clarinet educators Jiang Baocheng and Tao Ran. Tao Ran, a Clarinet associate professor at the school, has performed solo clarinet and chamber music concerts. He received several awards for his excellent instruction and musicianship. Tao, like Chen, also studied under Jiang Baocheng. When Chen was 16, he learned basic theories of composition under Ju Zongze, a teacher and assistant lecturer at Shenzhen Arts School. He taught music theory, solfeggio, etc.

In 2002, Chen permanently moved to Shanghai and was admitted to the Shanghai Conservatory of Music with the Fu Chengxian Memorial Scholarship. He first majored in Clarinet, but Ju Zongze, who discovered Chen's strong interest in composition, suggested that he transfer to a Composition major. Chen later majored in Music Design and Production in the Department of Music Engineering, which was established in 2003. Around the same time, the Shanghai Conservatory of Music invited Japanese musician Tanimura Shinji to join the department as a resident professor. When Chen attended Tanimura's master class in 2005, he noted that Tanimura's work combined Japanese folk music, oriental pentatonic melodies, and Western orchestral music. The learning experience gave much inspiration, especially Tanimura's concepts of "music has no borders" and "spread the positive energy of love." Shortly after that, Chen was one of the eight students from the department to join Tanimura for a concert performance at Expo 2005. He was responsible for the arrangement and production of the musical works, and performed as a pianist. It was also during that year, in November, when he won an award during a song activity organized by Tanimura and the Shanghai Federation of Literary and Art Circles for the opening of the Yangshan Port and Donghai Bridge.

Other than Tanimura, Chen also studied under the tutelage of An Dong, Chen Qiangbin, Wu Yuebei, Hu Taoyuan, Xu Jianqiang, and Qin Shile. The different styles, composition philosophies, and approaches to music taught by the first three teachers greatly influenced Chen's work later in his career. While he studied, he also assisted An Dong in producing film and television music.

In September 2006, Chen's work "GAMES OF FANTASIA" won the first prize at the annual concert of the Department of Music Engineering. He also received three awards for the best creativity, teamwork, and popularity. During the same year, he worked with An Dong on the films The Tokyo Trial and Fiery Autumn Wind. In June 2007, the department held the Undergraduate Outstanding Graduation Works Concert and Exhibition. Chen's "Challenging Hollywood" was selected as the department's outstanding work and won the first prize, and then was performed. Later that year, Chen graduated from the Shanghai Conservatory of Music with honors and joined An Dong's studio.

Film and television scoring career

Armor Hero series
In 2009, Chen composed the soundtrack for the first season of Armor Warriors, directed by Zheng Guowei. The story tells of five gifted people who don magical battle armor handed down in China since ancient times, and together they become warriors representing the power of light. They fight against forces of darkness to save their world. In 2010, the series was followed by the film Armor Hero Emperor, which Zheng Guowei also directed and Chen scored.

In 2016, Chen composed the theme song "God's Rival" for the film Armor Hero Captor King, with the lyrics provided by Zhou Bingyi and Jing Qian. Two years later, since Chen was the composer of the original Armor Warriors, he was invited to be the music director for Armor Hero Chronicles, a film commemorating ten years since the series began. In addition to producing the soundtrack, he composed and sang the ending theme song, "Kaixuan".

Collaborations with Chan Kwong-wing
At an unknown time, Chen joined Click Music, the studio of Hong Kongese film composer Chan Kwong-wing. Chen accumulated much practical experience at the studio and learned various musical languages and styles since creating film soundtracks had him dabble in genres such as hip-hop, jazz, electronic music, etc. He and Chan worked together to produce the score for The Last Tycoon, a 2012 period drama film directed by Hong Kong cinema veteran Wong Jing. The film is set in early 1900s Shanghai and follows the story of a tycoon named Cheng Daqi and his associates who get caught in the events of the Second Sino-Japanese War. Chen and Chan Kwong-wing's work on the soundtrack got nominated for the "Best Original Film Score" at the 32nd Hong Kong Film Awards.

Their next collaboration was for Wong Jing's From Vegas to Macau (2014), a crime-comedy film. Chen and Chan also worked on the scores for its sequels From Vegas to Macau II (2015) and From Vegas to Macau III (2016). The three films are part of the God of Gamblers franchise. After From Vegas to Macau III, Chen and Chan worked on the score of The Founding of an Army (2017), a historical drama film directed by Andrew Lau commemorating the 90th anniversary of the founding of the People's Liberation Army. Their work earned them the Golden Deer Award for the "Best Original Music Score" at the 14th Changchun Film Festival. They next worked on Andrew Lau's The Captain in 2019, a film based on the events surrounding Sichuan Airlines Flight 8633. It was one of the films that competed in the Golden Deer Awards at the 15th Changchun Film Festival in 2020.

Raymond Yip films

The first film score Chen independently produced was for Bump in the Road, a 2013 comedy film directed by Raymond Yip. The film's story tells of a man named Zhang Kai who suddenly receives an ultrasound image of his child; he embarks on a road trip with his younger brother Xin to search for the child's mother. Chen provided his vocals for the songs "Snatch the Bouquet", "On the Road", and "Far Place".

In 2014, Chen returned to score Raymond Yip's The House That Never Dies, a thriller film based on the haunted house Chaonei No. 81. Director Yip gave great importance to the music and did not give restrictions on producing the soundtrack. It was a challenge for Chen as he had no reference for the music, so he created the style, structure, tempo, and orchestration himself. Yip approved the overall design of the music. The film was a box-office hit and became the highest-grossing Chinese horror film. The 2017 sequel, The House That Never Dies II, was directed by Qian Renhao. Chen composed its ending theme song, "Soul Returns".

In January 2015, the suspense thriller film Tales of Mystery, directed by Raymond Yip, Tian Meng, and Xian Xuchu, was released. Its music production was the first test of Chen's creative techniques in the genre of horror music and influenced his work on The House That Never Dies. The film is divided into three acts, each having a unique musical style. The first story is "Japanese-style creepy," the second is "American-style brutal," and the third is "heartwarming with emotions."

The next film directed by Raymond Yip was Phantom of the Theatre in 2016, a thriller like his two previous works. The story tells of a haunted theater filled with the spirits of a performance troupe that perished in a fire many years prior. What Chen found to be most time-consuming in producing the music was not the rigorous score and complex engineering but making the score rich while not complicated, concise and not monotonous. Aside from horror music, Chen took on four themes for the soundtrack: fate, love, and the ordinary and magical sides of the Palace Theater. These themes blend and change with each other. Chen composed "The Mist," the film's theme song that takes on love. His score for the film had received both praise and criticism. Jonathan Broxton of Movie Music UK, in his film score review, wrote, "Phantom of the Theatre has, quite rightly, been the recipient of quite a bit of critical praise in 2016, and despite its flaws I certainly recommend it for anyone wanting to dip their toes into Chinese film music."

Butterfly Cemetery
In April 2016, Chen was invited to produce the score for Butterfly Cemetery. A film based on a novel of the same name by Cai Jun and directed by Ma Weihao, it tells of a woman named Shang Xiaodi who meets a half-butterfly man during a trip to Budapest. Compared to his previous film works, Chen chose a more modern style for the music, and the techniques he employed were influenced by German composer Hans Zimmer's minimalist style. Since the story is set in Hungary, Chen incorporated Hungarian elements into the music. The music production went on for five months, and the film was released in October 2017.

Magic Town
In 2015, Motion Magic invited Chen to compose songs for Magic Town, an educational program for children. Most of the creative team were first-time parents or had young children, including Chen, whose partner was expecting their daughter. As Chen was about to become a father, he was motivated and proud to take on the project. Magic Town had nearly a hundred songs that took almost two years to produce, and many were improvised by Chen when he first worked on them. Chen considered the diversity of musical styles and incorporated elements from various genres such as folk, jazz, rock, electronic dance, new age, etc. He also took into account the fact that children are "exposed to advanced knowledge and culture." Therefore, he used trendy elements for nursery rhymes. The overall experience of working on the project was much different compared to Chen's past film and television works in terms of emotions. In film music, various emotions are present, including negative ones such as anger, fear, anxiety, and depression; Chen felt these as he composed. Magic Town was different because of its overall positive, bright themes. The show premiered in December 2016. At the same time, the music was released across four albums.

Game music production

Moonlight Blade
In 2015, Chen began to work as one of the music producers for Moonlight Blade, a martial arts-themed MMORPG by Tencent Games. He was under the guidance of music director Yang Jie, who was strict about innovation in music. Chen went beyond limits in producing his work for them to reach their best quality. He incorporated new instruments into his works, such as traditional Chinese instruments, which, according to Chen, made the style of the game music "refreshing." He was also interested in integrating elements of Chinese folk music into the soundtrack to create a "new national style" of folk music to promote Chinese culture. While working on the game, he also built his own fan base. He began to care more about players' preferences as regular communication with them brought changes to his ideas; he made his music more inclusive and integrated more elements into it. Through all this, Chen established his confidence in music as he formed his style and direction.

Many filmmakers were involved in the game's story creation, martial arts action, art style, costume design, etc. In the process, the game incorporated cinematic creation techniques. Following this, Chen requested to produce the landing music at the level of film music. He composed the soundtrack "Thousand People, Thousand Faces", which plays at the beginning of the game as the player selects and modifies their character. Chen noted that the landing music shapes the first impression of the whole game. Therefore, the music was based not solely on the theme of martial arts but on the curiosity and enthusiasm felt by players when exploring the game world. Also noted was that treating the music with high requirements and quality was unavoidable. The arpeggio elements in the music from Final Fantasy inspired Chen's work on the track. In February 2017, Chen released an album containing his works for Moonlight Blade from 2015 to 2017, including  "Thousand People, Thousand Faces" in the tracklist. Chen later adapted the song into "Wind of the World", a theme song for The World of Swinging Swords competition in November 2017.

In 2018, Chen composed the theme song "Dreams of Farewell" for Yihua, one of the martial arts sects players can choose to join upon creating their character. The theme of the song was based on a soundtrack previously created for Moonlight Blade, "Treading the Waves in the Sea" by Liang Bangyan. It was a challenge since the theme may not be suitable for singing, and for Chen to adapt the work of a senior composer he admired. Previously, Chen arranged theme songs by himself. This time, to bring new ideas to players, he invited a composer from Beijing, Cui Zhi'en, to participate in the song production. Another person was supposed to work on the sound mixing, but since each revision brought new inspiration, Chen mixed the song himself. The song was written by Wubi and sung by Zhou Shen.

In 2019, Chen produced the Taibai sect theme, "Saying Sword." Wang Yibo provided his vocals for the song. The folk music and strings were performed by Qingqin Qingqing and the International Master Philharmonic Orchestra, respectively. "Saying Sword" was Chen's final work for Moonlight Blade before producing the soundtrack for Genshin Impact.

Genshin Impact

In 2019, video game developer company miHoYo got Chen to produce the soundtrack for their title Genshin Impact with their in-house music studio HOYO-MiX. It was Chen's first major video game work, and he described the project as a difficult challenge. The game has an open-world environment that features areas referred to as regions, with visual designs inspired by different world cultures. In composing the music for these regions, Chen chose a style that integrates elements of traditional folk music with Western musical arrangements. During the pre-release development stage, the game only featured Mondstadt and Liyue, two of the planned seven regions. On top of idyllic rural scenery, medieval European architectural styles and cultures inspired the design of Mondstadt. In composing the music for Mondstadt, Chen borrowed the language and rhythm of Impressionism and used the piano, tin whistle instruments, and medieval-style lutes. The Mondstadt soundtrack was performed by the London Philharmonic Orchestra. Chen was present during the scoring sessions in London and conducted some scores himself, including the "Genshin Impact Main Theme." For Liyue, which had scenic Eastern fantasy as its basis, he used elements of Chinese folk music—traditional instruments, the pentatonic scale, and ancient tonal melodies—with Western romantic harmonies and orchestral arrangements. The Liyue soundtrack was performed by the Shanghai Symphony Orchestra. An Dong, one of Chen's mentors from the Shanghai Conservatory of Music, served as a music supervisor during the scoring sessions of the soundtrack. Chen especially enjoyed composing combat music, using various composition techniques such as polyphony and taking orchestration elements from composers such as Ludwig van Beethoven.

In a Sina Weibo post published in November 2020, Chen expressed disappointment that Genshin Impact did not get nominated for "Best Original Soundtrack" at The Game Awards 2020. Nevertheless, he expressed his pride as a Chinese composer. Chen later got awarded "Outstanding Artist — Newcomer/Breakthrough" at the Annual Game Music Awards 2020 held by the music journalism website Video Game Music Online (VGMO). He also spoke to VGMO in an interview about future music-related offline activities, including concerts. The first concert for Genshin Impact was held in October 2021 through an online event to celebrate the game's first anniversary. Among the involved performers was Belgian composer and conductor Dirk Brossé, who conducted Chen's nominated work "The Curse of Blood" at the 2019 World Soundtrack Awards.

In 2022, a selected number of Genshin Impact soundtracks, including Chen's compositions "Liyue," "Rapid as Wildfires," and "Contemplation in Snow," got included in the 2022 Winter Olympics music library to be used in sports exhibitions. "Contemplation in Snow" was featured in a promotional video for the Beijing National Speed Skating Oval, a competition area constructed specially for the event.

Personal projects

2017: Time Tunnel and Midnight Radio

On April 14, 2017, Chen released the singles "Midnight Radio" and "Time Tunnel." He composed both songs while Tian Chenming wrote the lyrics. They previously collaborated on various projects including Armor Hero Emperor (2010), Painted Skin: The Resurrection (2012), and  Bump in the Road (2013).

"Midnight Radio" started with a rhythm that came to Chen's mind as he walked down an empty road at night. He shared this with Tian, who came up with lyrics. Tian later explained in a comment that the convenience store mentioned at the beginning of the song is a Lawson store located at the intersection of Fuxing Road and Maoming Road. What also inspired the lyrics are the times he squatted on the side of the road to smoke cigarettes in the middle of the night; the clerk at the store would play the midnight radio. Chen wrote "Time Tunnel" eight years before its release when he had planned to release ten songs in "honor of his passing youth." He then intended to dedicate these songs to those who supported him, and his friend Tian had also encouraged him multiple times to release his own song album. Tian commented on the song, "I wrote the lyrics in 2009, and in 2017, Zhiyi just finished recording and posted them. Unconsciously, the phrasing and style have changed a lot, and the motifs [representing] different age groups are also different. Every time I think about it this way, it's like walking into a time tunnel."

2018: You're Not Here and A Cup of Moon
In 2018, Chen collaborated with lyricist Jing Qian to produce the song "You're Not Here". The song was based on a poem that Jing wrote at the time his grandfather had passed away, two years prior to the song's creation. When Chen read the poem for the first time, his grandfather had also recently passed away. He decided to finish the song in one go as his grandmother was also seriously ill. And before releasing the song, Chen had many of his relatives and his grandmother listen to it before she died. The song was released on February 1, 2018. Chen said, "I personally think that this is a completely non-commercial song about family affection, expressing my deepest thoughts. I hope that others can understand my feelings, but I don’t want it to be overly snooped on by people. I hesitated for a long time between publishing it or not. In the end, I chose to let more people hear it and call for more memories of my loved ones."

Chen and Jing next worked on  "A Cup of Moon", together with music engineers He Jiade and Kaola, and mixing engineer Liu Junjie. It was a song originally made for the Qingqin Qingqing band, hence its length of six minutes. Yin Lin, a singer Chen invited to participate in the project, persistently suggested shortening the song, but Chen continued with his vision. He also completed the arrangement in one sitting during an eight-hour-long live broadcast. The recording and mixing took half a year, and the song was released on October 6, 2018.

2019: Being Towards Death

After two years of production, Chen digitally released his first original album, Being Towards Death, on April 2, 2019. It includes various works created over ten years and features new recordings of previously released works, such as  "Midnight Radio," "Time Tunnel," and "A Cup of Moon." The production of the album was supported through crowdfunding. With an initial goal of 30,000 RMB, the project raised 38,000. According to lyricist and project planner Jing Qian, the difficulty of the production lied in the communication as each song involved illustrators, video creators, and other artists. All songs he worked on got revised at least twice before arriving at the finished product; "A Cup of Moon" got revised at least three times. He also described Chen's attitude towards music as "rigorous." Column editor Xiao Xiao, explaining a bit of the production, said, "Chen really went out of his way for his precious album. Every day, he worked until one or two o’clock in the morning before going home, just to optimize and re-optimize all the songs at the last minute. Even several songs were re-edited directly and recorded again. So the songs that have been published on NetEase [Cloud] Music have big differences in the new album."

Other works and activities

Shanghai Conservatory of Music

Digital Audio China
In October 2009, the eARTS Digital Audio Competition by Digital Audio China officially launched. It was an event organized by the Shanghai Conservatory of Music, the China Association of Recording Engineers, and Yangpu District government to promote China's development and research in digital audio and related fields. The competition's judging panel included musical engineers Simon Rhodes of Abbey Road Studios, Nick Wollage of AIR Studios, and record producer Quincy Jones, among others. During the semi-finals, Chen placed second in Recording Art and first in the Music Arrangement and Multimedia Soundtrack categories. Shanghai Sequence Culture Communication Co., Ltd. represented him, which Chen heads. At the finals held in March 2010, he won the first prize in the Multimedia Soundtrack category, second prize in Recording Art, and third prize in Music Arrangement. Chen commented in an interview during the awards gala, "I originally participated in this competition with the mentality of giving [it] a try. I feel that winning the award is a kind of affirmation for me and my music!"

In April 2012, Chen participated as a guest at the second Digital Audio Competition by Digital Audio China. He joined the event with two other first-prize winners from the first competition in 2010, Peng Fei and Guo Shensheng. Their commissioned works were performed at the awards gala.

After three events of the Digital Audio Competition, the Shanghai Conservatory of Music held the International Digital Music Festival in December 2021. The event was jointly organized by the Shanghai Music and Art Development Collaborative Innovation Center, game developer company miHoYo and their music studio HOYO-MiX. It saw the participation of local and foreign digital music industry veterans and university subject leaders; it also included forums and lectures on recording art, film and video game music, etc. Chen participated in the event to gave a lecture on the music production of Genshin Impact, where he shared the process of game music production based on his own experience, including: frame drafting, MIDI arrangement production, score production, orchestral recording, sound mixing and mastering, and soundtrack music naming and illustration design. During the lecture, Chen also shared his experience of cooperating with orchestras and musicians from different countries in the process of music production through a large number of video materials. He talked about the concept of "huayong" in creation, connecting it to absorption of the essence of Western musical elements and turning them into internal skills of his own music creation.

The next International Digital Music Festival took place from October to December 2022. Chen and miHoYo music director Cai Jinhan joined as game music team judges.

School program lecture
In July 2016, the Shanghai Conservatory of Music hosted an art summer school program for academic graduate students. The program focused on the theme of music and technology, and with activities covering the research, production, performance of music. Chen was invited alongside several other teachers and experts in the music industry to give lectures. For his lecture, he discussed his work for Phantom of the Theatre (2016), explaining the music production process of the score.

Shanghai Expo 2010
From May to October, Shanghai hosted the Expo 2010. Among the various organized activities was a large-scale parade performed every day. One of its routes was the Puxi Line at Longhua East Road, for which Chen composed the theme song "Good Dream Is a Song".

Beautiful Sunday clarinet concert
On July 24, 2012, Clarinet associate professor Tao Ran of Shenzhen Arts School hosted a clarinet concert at the Shenzhen Concert Hall. The concert included performances covering classical, romantic and jazz styles. He also led ten students, including Chen, to perform eight clarinet works in the form of solo and chamber music, including Felix Mendelssohn's "Concert Piece No. 2," André Messager's "Solo de Concours," and Franz Krommer's "Clarinet Concerto No. 1, Op. 36." Chen composed an original piece specially for the concert, "Legend", for the piano and clarinet.

Tao Ran again hosted the Beautiful Sunday clarinet concert on November 19, 2017, which was sponsored by the Propaganda Department of the Shenzhen Municipal Party Committee and the Shenzhen Municipal Bureau of Culture, Sports and Tourism. Alongside "Legend," more original works by Chen were performed for the concert: "Mystery", "Discovery", "Emergency", "Truth", and "Challenge".

Wuhan Conservatory of Music
On November 13, 2016, Chen carried out a lecture at the Wuhan Conservatory of Music as part of their three-day Applied Electronic Music Forum. The lecture was titled "The Production Process of Film Music: Taking 'Phantom of the Theatre' as an Example". The next day, Chen, together with composer and music producer Shen Dan, carried out a master class on applied electronic music.

Qingqin Qingqing band
In 2017, Chen founded Qingqin Qingqing, also called 4Q, a band that focuses on the Zhongguo Feng genre. The band includes a dozen members, each having a different traditional instrument, such as the erhu, dizi, xiao, and guzheng. According to  musician Juanmo, "Qín" and "Qìng" refer to music and ancient music, respectively. The third character, "Qìng", means relaxed or happy. Together, these characters express a scene where a group of friends who love ancient music get together to play music with ease and joy.

In June 2018, the singles "Endless" and "Twelve Gods", both composed by Chen, were released on online music platforms. On July 22, Qingqin Qingqing debuted at Bilibili Macro Link (BML), a concert event held at the Mercedes-Benz Arena in Shanghai. The event saw more than 4.5 million people from offline and online audiences.

Stage events
On January 1, 2017, Chen participated in the Moonlight Blade Guofeng Carnival theme music exhibition, which was held at the Sun Palace Magic Theater in Nanjing City.

From May to June 2017, Chen participated as a judge in the Guofeng Cover Singing Contest held by DouYu and Tencent.

In 2018, Chen participated in Xuanwuji Guofeng Music Festival where he performed the song "Brocade" with Jiu Quan. The song was later released as "Brocade Colors" in Chen's 2019 album Being Towards Death, with the female vocals performed by Bu Cai.

Filmography

Film

Television

Animation

City promotion

Discography

Video games

Collaborations

Personal works

Awards and nominations

References

External links
 Yu-peng Chen on IMDb
  on Douban

Social
  on Bilibili
  on Sina Weibo
 chenzhiyimusic on Weixin
  on Youku
  on Zhihu

Music
 Yu-Peng Chen on Apple Music
  on Bandcamp
  on KuGou 5SING
  on NetEase Cloud Music
  on QQ Music
 Yu-Peng Chen on Spotify

Chinese classical composers
Chinese male classical composers
1984 births
Living people
21st-century classical composers
Musicians from Shanghai
Shanghai Conservatory of Music alumni